Elvira Lutz (born 2 December 1935) is a Uruguayan midwife, sex educator, and writer. A feminist activist, she has been an advocate for women's sexual and reproductive rights, and a member of the Advisory Council of the Latin American and Caribbean Women's Health Network (RSMLAC).

Early life and education
Elvira Lutz was born in Trinidad, Uruguay on 2 December 1935. She studied teaching, and moved to Montevideo at age 20.

She attended the University of the Republic's , graduating in 1964.

Career
Lutz began her professional career at the Ministry of Public Health's External Assistance Service and at Hospital Pereira Rossell in the 1960s. In 1968, she joined the Uruguayan Family Planning Association, where she worked on issues related to sex education, alongside her husband, psychologist Arnaldo Gomensoro, until 1992. She was editor of the association's bulletin, Ser Mujer (I Am Woman).

For two consecutive terms, from 1986 to 1990, she was elected permanent secretary of the Latin American Federation of Sexology Societies (FLASSES). In 2002, she was one of the founders of the Uruguayan branch of the Humanized Childbirth Network.

As an educator, she taught courses, seminars, and workshops on humanized childbirth and female sexuality, both nationally and internationally. Likewise, she provided consultancies in projects on family planning, quality of care, and sexual and reproductive health at women's NGOs and private institutions.

From 1985 to 1987, Lutz was the editor-in-chief of Cotidiano Mujer, contributing an article on abortion titled "Why do only men have the floor?" to its August 1985 issue. She is the author of numerous publications on women's rights and female sexuality. In 2018, she published the book Provocaciones de una parteraː pasado, presente y futuro (Provocations of a Midwifeː Past, Present and Future). In the epilogue, she wrote:

Selected publications

References

1935 births
21st-century Uruguayan women writers
21st-century Uruguayan writers
Living people
Midwives
People from Trinidad, Uruguay
Relationships and sexuality writers
University of the Republic (Uruguay) alumni
Uruguayan women's rights activists